Thorne is a surname of English origin, originally referring to a thorn bush. Thorne is the 1,721st most common surname name in the United States.

Notable people with the name include:

People
 Adande Thorne, Trinidadian-American YouTube celebrity
 Alfred A. Thorne (born 1871), British Guyanese statesman, author and activist
 Angela Thorne (born 1939), English actor
 Bella Thorne (born 1997), American actress, singer, and model
 Callie Thorne (born 1969), American actress
 Carlos Thorne (born 1924), Peruvian novelist, writer and lawyer
Chris Thorne (actor) in Shake Hands with the Devil (2007 film)
Chris Thorn in Minnesota Vikings draft history
 Christopher Thorne (disambiguation)
Christopher Thorn (musician) in Blind Melon
Christopher Thorne, historian
Christopher Thorne, Creative Commons board member
 Courtney Thorne-Smith (born 1967), American actress
David Thorne (disambiguation), several people
 David Thorne (British Army officer) (1933–2000)
 David Thorne (diplomat) (born 1944), American businessman and diplomat
 David Thorne (cricketer) (born 1964), English cricketer
 David Thorne (rugby league) (born 1965), Australian rugby league footballer
 David Thorne (writer) (born 1972), Australian humourist, satirist and author
 Dyanne Thorne (born 1943), American actress, model, and showgirl
 Eric Thorne (1862–1922), English singer and actor
 Edward Thorne (disambiguation), several people:
 Edward Thorne (politician) (1746–1820), political figure in Nova Scotia
 Edward Thorne (naval officer) (1923–2013), Royal New Zealand Navy officer
 Edward Thorne (musician) (1834–1916), English classical organist
 Edwin F. Thorne (1845–1897), American stage actor
 Frank Thorne (born 1930), American comic book artist-writer
 Gary Thorne (born 1948), American sportscaster
 Geoffrey Thorne (born 1970), American screenwriter, novelist and actor
 George Thorne (disambiguation), several people
 George Thorne (fl. 1636–1662), mayor of Reading
 George Thorne (actor) (1856–1922), English singer and actor
 George Thorne (golfer), British golfer who competed in the 1900 Summer Olympics
 George Thorne (footballer) (born 1993), English footballer for Derby County F.C.
 George Thorne (politician) (1853–1934), British solicitor and politician
 Gordon Thorne (1897–1942), English cricketer and British Army officer
 Graeme Thorne (1951–1960), kidnap and murder victim
 Grahame Thorne (born 1946), New Zealand rugby player and MP
 Isabel Thorne (1834–1910), British campaigner for medical education for women 
 Jack Thorne (disambiguation), several people
 Jack Thorne, British writer and playwright
 Jack "Doc" Thorne, character in the novel Jurassic Park
 Jack Thorne (mathematician), British mathematician
 Jaime Thorne León (born 1943), Peruvian lawyer and former Minister of Defence of Peru
 James Thorne (disambiguation)
 James Thorne (footballer) (1996–), English professional footballer
 James Thorne (preacher) (1795–1872), English Methodist preacher and editor
 Jeff Thorne, American football coach player
 John Thorne (disambiguation), several people
 John Thorne (American football) (born 1957), American football coach
 John Thorne (colonial administrator) (1888–1964), civil servant in the Indian Civil Service
 John Thorne (MP) in 1388, MP for Guildford
 John Thorne (writer), American culinary writer
 John Thorne (racing driver) (born 1969), British auto racing driver
 Jon Thorne, English double bassist and composer
 Juan Luis Cipriani Thorne (born 1943), Roman Catholic Cardinal Priest and Archbishop of Lima 
 Julia Thorne (1944–2006), American writer and first wife of U.S. Secretary of State John Kerry
 Junaid Thorne, radical Muslim preacher from Australia
 Kip Thorne (born 1940), American theoretical physicist 
 Larry Thorne, nom de guerre of Finnish mercenary Lauri Törni
 Leslie Thorne (1916–1993), British racing driver
 Lizette Thorne (1882–1970), English-born silent film actress
 Mary Evans Thorne (c. 1740–after 1813), American Methodist leader
 Matt Thorne (born 1974 ), English novelist
 Michael G. Thorne (born 1940), American politician
 Michelle Thorne (born 1975), British actress, director, and model
 Neil Thorne (born 1932), British Conservative Party politician
 Nola Thorne, Panamanian track and field athlete
 Norman Thorne (1902-1925), convicted of the 'Chicken run murder'
Payton Thorne (born 2001), American football player
 Peter Thorne (disambiguation)
Peter Thorne (Australian footballer) (born 1960), Australian rules footballer and coach
Peter Thorne (climatologist), climatologist and professor of physical geography
Peter Thorne (English footballer) (born 1973), English football player
Peter Thorne (reporter), reporter and anchorman for WPIX-TV
Peter Thorne (RAF officer) (1923–2014), fighter pilot and test pilot
 Reuben Thorne (born 1975), New Zealand rugby union player
 Robert Folger Thorne (born 1920), American botanist
 Rhonda Thorne (born 1958), Australian squash player
 Ryan Thorne (born 1971), Canadian women's basketball coach
 Sarah Thorne (1836 - 1899), British actress
 Stan Thorne (1918–2007), British Labour Party politician
 Shane Thorne, ring name of Australian wrestler Shane Veryzer (born 1985)
 Stephen Thorne (1935–2019), British actor
 Thomas Thorne (1841–1918), English actor and theatre manager
 Thomas Woolsey Thorne (1823–1885), American police officer
 Will Thorne (1857–1946), British trade unionist and Labour Party Member of Parliament
 William Thorne (disambiguation)
William Thorne (chronicler) (fl. 1397), English Benedictine monk
William Thorne (orientalist) (c 1568–1630), English Hebraist
William Thorne Sr. (c. 1616–c.1664), American Quaker, signer of the Flushing Remonstrance
William Thorne (mayor of Brisbane), mayor of Brisbane, Queensland, Australia, 1898
William Thorne (mayor of Cape Town) (1839–1917), mayor of Cape Town (1901–1904)
William Henry Thorne (1844–1923), Canadian Senator for New Brunswick (1913–1923)
William P. Thorne (1845–1928), Lieutenant Governor of Kentucky (1903–1907)
William Thorne (philatelist) (1845–1907), American businessman and philatelist
William V.S. Thorne (1865–1920), American tennis player
William L. Thorne (1878–1948), American film actor
William A. Thorne Jr., judge of the Utah Court of Appeals (2000–present)
 Willie Thorne (1954–2020), English snooker player and sports commentator
 Worley Thorne, American screenwriter, television writer, and college instructor

Fictional characters
 Ser Alliser Thorne, character in the book series A Song of Ice and Fire and its television adaptation
 Chris Thorne, character in Nothing but Trouble (1991 film)
 Emily Thorne, character in the television series Revenge
 Freddie Thorne, character in the television series Peaky Blinders
 Rupert Thorne, crime boss and enemy of Batman in DC Comics publications
 Thomas Thorne, the title character of Anthony Trollope's book Doctor Thorne and its TV adaptation.
 Carswell Thorne, character in the book series The Lunar Chronicles
 Thomas Thorne, character in the television series Ghosts (2019 TV series)

See also
 Doctor Thorne, novel
 Graeme Thorne kidnapping
 List of Old English (Anglo-Saxon) surnames

References

 "A Brief History Of The Thorne Name", A Brief History Of The Thorne Name, Accessed May 23, 2007.
 "Statistics for THORNE", Behind the Name, Accessed May 23, 2007.

English-language surnames